James Frederick Stuart-Wortley JP (16 January 1833 – 27 November 1870) was a politician in New Zealand and the UK. He was New Zealand's inaugural Baby of the House and remains the youngest member of parliament in the country's history; in fact he was too young (at 20 years and 7 months) to even be legally elected.

Early life
Stuart-Wortley was born in York, UK, in 1833 and was the third son of the 2nd Lord Wharncliffe and his wife, Lady Georgiana Elizabeth Ryder. He was the younger brother of the 1st Earl of Wharncliffe (1827–1899). Charles Stuart-Wortley-Mackenzie and James Stuart-Wortley were his uncles. Dudley Ryder, 1st Earl of Harrowby was his maternal grandfather.

Career
In 1850 he travelled to New Zealand as a colonist on the Charlotte Jane, one of the First Four Ships sent by the Canterbury Association. In his first year, he lived with other bachelors in Lyttelton—Charles Bowen, Thomas Hanmer, and Charles Maunsell—in a place dubbed "Singleton House" by Charlotte Godley.

He bought  of land at Tai Tapu near Halswell. In October 1852, he purchased Run 53, located between Lake Ellesmere / Te Waihora and the Selwyn River / Waikirikiri. He on-sold the land in June 1853 and it became part of the Harman and Davie's Station. Stuart-Wortley then started Hawkeswood Station in partnership with others. This station was located north of the Waiau Uwha River.

New Zealand parliament

On 27 August 1853, he was elected to the 1st New Zealand Parliament as a representative of the Christchurch Country electorate, which consisted of rural Canterbury and much of Westland. He was 20 years and 7 months when elected; so was not yet 21, the minimum age to qualify as an elector. The other qualifications in 1853 were to be male, a British subject, to own a certain value of land, and to not be serving a criminal sentence. At the time of his election, there were no political parties in New Zealand nor was there a Prime Minister.

After the first session of Parliament finished in August 1854, Stuart-Wortley travelled with Frederick Weld from Auckland (where Parliament met in those years) to Tauranga, Maketu and Rotorua. He resigned his seat on 18 July 1855 and returned to the United Kingdom. His seat stayed vacant until the next election, which was held on 20 December 1855 in the Christchurch Country electorate.

Return to England
He was appointed a Justice of the Peace in early 1858. He returned to England later in 1858.

In the UK, he stood for election to the House of Commons at the 1865 general election, when he was an unsuccessful Conservative Party candidate for Sheffield.

Personal life
Stuart-Wortley died in England in November 1870, aged 37. His elder brother Edward built St Mary and St John's Church, Hardraw as a memorial to him.

Notes

References

1833 births
1870 deaths
Members of the New Zealand House of Representatives
Younger sons of barons
James
People from York
Conservative Party (UK) parliamentary candidates
Canterbury Pilgrims
New Zealand MPs for South Island electorates
English emigrants to New Zealand
19th-century New Zealand politicians